Sokolsky or Sokolski may refer to:

Places
Sokółka County (powiat sokólski), an administrative division of Poland
Sokolska planina, a mountain in Serbia
Sokolski Monastery, a Bulgarian Orthodox monastery
Sokolsky District, several districts in Russia
Sokolsky (inhabited locality) (Sokolskaya, Sokolskoye), several inhabited localities in Russia
Sokolsky Urban Okrug, a municipal formation of Nizhny Novgorod Oblast, Russia, which Sokolsky District is incorporated as

Other
Sokolski horse, a breed of horse
Sokolsky (surname), including a list of people with the name
Sokolsky Opening, an uncommon chess opening

See also
Sokol (disambiguation)